Psilocybe kumaenorum is a species of mushroom in the family Hymenogastraceae. The mushroom contains the psychoactive compound psilocybin. It is in the section Zapotecorum of the genus Psilocybe, other members of this section include Psilocybe muliercula, Psilocybe angustipleurocystidiata, Psilocybe aucklandii, Psilocybe collybioides, Psilocybe graveolens, Psilocybe zapotecorum, Psilocybe pintonii, Psilocybe subcaerulipes, Psilocybe moseri, Psilocybe zapotecoantillarum, Psilocybe zapotecocaribaea, and Psilocybe antioquiensis.

See also
List of Psilocybin mushrooms
Psilocybin mushrooms

References

External links

Entheogens
Fungi described in 1967
Fungi of North America
Psychoactive fungi
kumaenorum
Psychedelic tryptamine carriers